Novo Zvečevo is a village in Požega-Slavonia County, Croatia. The village is administered as a part of the Brestovac municipality. According to national census of 2001, the population of the village is 27. The village is connected by the D69 state road.

Sources

Populated places in Požega-Slavonia County